Horsfieldia fragillima is a species of plant in the family Myristicaceae. It is a tree endemic to Borneo.

References

fragillima
Endemic flora of Borneo
Trees of Borneo
Vulnerable plants
Taxonomy articles created by Polbot
Taxobox binomials not recognized by IUCN